Agata may refer to:

 AGATA (organization), a Lithuanian non-profit performing rights organization

Name
 Agata (given name)
 Agata (surname)

Places
Agata Station, a train station in Ashikaga, Tochigi Prefecture, Japan

Physics
 AGATA (gamma-ray detector), Advance GAmma Tracking Array

Miscellaneous
 Agata (dog), a Colombian drug-detection dog
 7366 Agata, a main belt asteroid discovered in 1996
 Agata potato, a potato variety
 Histria Agata, a floating storage and offloading unit